This page lists the results of leadership elections within the Progressive Conservative Party of Ontario (known as the Conservative Party of Ontario before 1942).

Before 1920, leaders of the Conservative Party were usually chosen by caucus. In 1914, William Hearst was selected at a meeting of the province's executive council (or cabinet) as James Whitney, the previous leader, had died while holding the office of Premier of Ontario.

All of the party's leadership races before 1990 were determined by delegated conventions. The leadership races of 1990, 2002 and 2004 were determined by a weighted vote of all party members, with each constituency contributing an equal number of "votes" to the total. The 1990 race was decided in one round, while the 2002 race took two. For the 2004 election, the party introduced a preferential balloting system, such that party members would only be required to vote one time.

1920 Conservative Party leadership convention

(Held on December 2, 1920.)

Howard Ferguson won on first ballot
Earl Lawson
George Stewart Henry

(Note:  The vote totals were not announced.)

When Ferguson resigned as Premier in 1930, he selected George Henry as his replacement.  Henry was subsequently confirmed as party leader at a special Meeting on June 24, 1931.

1936 Conservative Party leadership convention

(Held on May 28, 1936 at the Royal York Hotel in Toronto.)

First ballot:

Earl Rowe 782
George A. Drew 480
William James Stewart 157
Leopold Macaulay 90
Wilfrid Heighington 70
Adam Acres 47
Arthur Ellis 10

Second ballot:

Earl Rowe 1,005
George A. Drew 660

1938 Conservative Party leadership convention

(Held on December 9, 1938, at the Royal York Hotel in Toronto.)

George A. Drew 796
Earl Lawson 413
Wilfrid Heighington 41
Norman Rawson 22

1949 Progressive Conservative leadership convention

(Held on April 27, 1949.)

Leslie Frost 842
Leslie Blackwell 442
Kelso Roberts 121
Dana Porter 65

1961 Progressive Conservative leadership convention

(Held on October 25, 1961.)

First ballot:

Kelso Roberts 352
John Robarts 345
Robert Macaulay 339
James Allan 332
A.W. Downer 149
Matthew Dymond 148
George Wardrope 45

Second ballot:

John Robarts 423
Kelso Roberts 385
Robert Macaulay 363
James Allan 324
A.W. Downer 104
Matthew Dymond 93

Third ballot:

John Robarts 498
Kelso Roberts 380
Robert Macaulay 372
James Allan 344
A.W. Downer 93

Fourth ballot:

John Robarts 533
Kelso Roberts 419
Robert Macaulay 377
James Allan 336

Fifth ballot:

John Robarts 746
Kelso Roberts 479
Robert Macaulay 438

Sixth ballot:

John Robarts 976
Kelso Roberts 633

1971 Progressive Conservative leadership convention

(Held on February 12, 1971.)

January 1985 Progressive Conservative leadership convention

(Held in Toronto on January 26, 1985.)

First ballot:

Frank Miller 591
Dennis Timbrell 421
Larry Grossman 378
Roy McMurtry 300

Second ballot (McMurtry supports Grossman):

Frank Miller 659
Larry Grossman 514
Dennis Timbrell 508

(Note:  These figures were confirmed by a recount.)

Third ballot (Timbrell supports Grossman):

Frank Miller 869
Larry Grossman 792

November 1985 Progressive Conservative leadership convention

(Held on November 16, 1985.)

First ballot:

Larry Grossman 752
Dennis Timbrell 661
Alan Pope 271

Second ballot:

Larry Grossman 848
Dennis Timbrell 829

1990 Progressive Conservative leadership convention

(Held on May 12, 1990.)

Mike Harris 7,175
Dianne Cunningham 5,825

(the non-weighted vote totals were: Harris 8,661, Cunningham 7,189)

The 1990 vote was the first held on the basis of one member one vote with votes weighted so that each riding had equal weight.

2002 Progressive Conservative leadership convention

(Held on March 23, 2002.)

First ballot:

Ernie Eves 4,257
Jim Flaherty 3,031
Tony Clement 1,354
Elizabeth Witmer 1,197
Chris Stockwell 448

(Note:  After the first ballot, Clement and Witmer both withdrew from the contest and supported Ernie Eves. Their names remained on the ballot for at least a part of the second round, however.)

Second ballot:

Ernie Eves 5,623
Jim Flaherty 3,898
Tony Clement 561
Elizabeth Witmer 216

(It is not clear if the non-weighted vote totals were released to the public.  44188 party members voted on the first ballot, 34,608 on the second.)

2004 Progressive Conservative leadership convention

(Held on September 18, 2004.)

First ballot:

John Tory 4,535.13 (45%)
Jim Flaherty 3,274.92 (33%)
Frank Klees 2,265.96 (22%)
5,039 electoral votes needed to win

(the non-weighted vote totals were Tory 12,132, Flaherty 7,951, Klees 5,240)

Second ballot:
John Tory 5,390.86 (54%)
Jim Flaherty 4,664.14 (46%)
5,028 electoral votes needed to win

(the non-weighted vote totals were Tory 18,037, Flaherty 14,353)

2009 Progressive Conservative Party of Ontario leadership convention

(Held on June 27, 2009, in Markham, Ontario)

Movement: Hillier eliminated and endorses Hudak; prior to balloting Hillier asked his supporters to make Hudak their second choice.

Does not include votes that were spoiled because no second choice was indicated.

Movement: Elliott eliminated

Does not include votes that were spoiled because no second or third choice was indicated.

2015 Progressive Conservative Party of Ontario leadership election

(Held in Toronto on May 27, 2015)

2018 Progressive Conservative Party of Ontario leadership election

(Held on March 10, 2018)

Called due to the resignation of party leader Patrick Brown on January 25, 2018 following allegations of sexual misconduct.

Results
 = Eliminated from next round
 = Winner

By Riding

References